Fucomimus mus, the Mousey klipfish, is a species of clinid found in subtropical waters of the Atlantic Ocean along the South African coast where it occurs in tide pools.  This species can reach a maximum length of  TL.  This species feeds on benthic crustaceans including amphipods, isopods and copepods, and gastropods.

References

Clinidae
Monotypic fish genera
Fish described in 1908
Taxa named by John Dow Fisher Gilchrist
Taxa named by William Wardlaw Thompson